Henry Dwight Thompson House is a historic home located at Westfield in Chautauqua County, New York.

It is a two-story, "L" shaped wood frame Victorian Carpenter Gothic style residence built in 1869.

It was listed on the National Register of Historic Places in 1983.

References

Houses in Chautauqua County, New York
Houses completed in 1869
Houses on the National Register of Historic Places in New York (state)
Carpenter Gothic houses in New York (state)
1869 establishments in New York (state)
National Register of Historic Places in Chautauqua County, New York